Larbi Oukada (born 26 June 1946) is a Moroccan middle-distance runner. He competed in the men's 3000 metres steeplechase at the 1968 Summer Olympics.

References

1946 births
Living people
Athletes (track and field) at the 1968 Summer Olympics
Moroccan male middle-distance runners
Moroccan male steeplechase runners
Olympic athletes of Morocco
Place of birth missing (living people)